Angele Tomo (born 11 April 1989) is a Cameroonian freestyle wrestler. She competed in the women's freestyle 69 kg event at the 2014 Commonwealth Games where she won a silver medal.

References

External links

1989 births
Living people
Sportspeople from Yaoundé
Cameroonian female sport wrestlers
Commonwealth Games silver medallists for Cameroon
Wrestlers at the 2014 Commonwealth Games
Commonwealth Games medallists in wrestling
African Wrestling Championships medalists
20th-century Cameroonian women
21st-century Cameroonian women
Medallists at the 2014 Commonwealth Games